Fullerton Cove is a rural suburb of the Port Stephens local government area in the Hunter Region of New South Wales, Australia, located just north of Fern Bay and adjacent to Fullerton Cove, from which the suburb gets its name. The Worimi people are the traditional owners of the Port Stephens area. At the 2021 Australian census the population of Fullerton Cove was 745.

Like Fern Bay, Fullerton Cove lies to the west of the Tasman Sea. Although the entire coastline is part of Stockton Beach there is no public access to the beach from Fullerton Cove. The only access in the suburb is via a private track, which is off-limits to the public, in a large sand mining development at the end of Coxs Lane.

Although the suburb is surrounded by several others, the only public road into the suburb is Nelson Bay Road, from Fern Bay in the south and Williamtown in the north.

Stanley Park 
On 77 Fullerton Cove Road is the location of Stanley Park first owned by James Smith built in 1837. Built on 880 acres which was given to James Smith 1837. In 1938 James sold to Gentleman John Smith. In 1897 Stanley Smith the grandson of John Smith built a two storey homestead at cost £1,800.  It remained the Smith family until 1968. The finals occupants were the spinster sister who moved out having the inability to pay for repairs. The property was sold in 1980 after being unoccupied for twelve years.

It has six marble fireplaces and cedar joinery throughout. The original French doors and wide verandahs with worugh iron lattice have been restored. The house is privately owned has eight Victorian style bedrooms on 28 acres of land. The property is used wedding, events, accommodation and high teas.

Transport
Fullerton Cove is served by Hunter Valley Buses route 136 from Stockton to Raymond Terrace. Coach operator Sid Fogg's depot is in Fullerton Cove.

Notes

References

External links

Suburbs of Port Stephens Council